Sanchai Ratiwatana and Sonchat Ratiwatana were the defending champions and successfully defended their title, defeating Nam Ji-sung and Song Min-kyu in the final, 7–6(7–2), 3–6, [10–7].

Seeds

Draw

References
 Main Draw

Busan Open - Doubles